Caringbah High School is a government-funded co-educational academically selective secondary day school, located in Caringbah, in the Sutherland Shire of Sydney, New South Wales, Australia.  The school was opened in 1960 as a co-educational high school and was nominated to become selective in 1989, over the neighbouring Port Hacking High.  approximately 907 students were enrolled.

School campus 

Before 2010, the school was split across two locations, the southern campus (on higher ground, known colloquially known as "top school") and the northern campus (on lower ground, know colloquially as "bottom school" or "the Annexe"). The campuses were linked by a covered walkway and grassed area. The southern campus was the original site which contained an auxiliary administrative office as well as music, industrial technology, applied science classrooms and languages.

As of the 1980s, the junior years were taught in the Annexe and senior years were taught in the older buildings on the southern campus.

However, due to the unstable clay foundation of the "top school", causing the campus to begin sinking, a construction project to consolidate all of the school's facilities commenced in 2007. and was completed in 2012. As of 2010, only the "bottom school" is in use and the abandoned buildings of the "top school" have become a noted site of urban decay and vandalism. On 2 April 2013, the school hall in the abandoned southern campus was destroyed by arson. On 29 August 2015, one of the other buildings in the southern campus was the site of another fire.  A year 12 student has secured $100,000 to add solar panels on the roof of the school hall, which is expected to create annual savings of $18,000.

Outdoor Learning Centre 
One of the key programs the school's environmental committee "Green Edge" has undertaken is the Outdoor Learning Centre (OLC). Construction started in August 2013. It is located near the site of the former walkway between the two campuses. Students and staff both had significant input into the design, and much of the work was constructed with the help of students and staff. The OLC consists of a central "pod", where classes can be held, and 5 smaller "pods" each based on bush tucker, a xeriscape, a meditative garden, an indigenous garden and a sensory garden.

Regeneration area
The school also has a "regeneration" area, where plants from pre-European settlement times grow. Seeds from trees and original native grasses populate the area, with students working to ensure the area remains free of introduced grasses and weeds. The area was formerly the driveway for teacher's cars between the two campuses. This area is one of only 3 in the Sutherland Shire and helps increase the biodiversity of the school, attracting a range of native animals including birds and possums. In September 2015, the school planted a wollemi pine in this area.

Faculties

Languages Other than English 

At Caringbah High, language is compulsory in years 7 and 8 and it is taught as an elective for years 9-12. Languages taught include French, Japanese, and Latin, and until 2020 the school also taught German. As of 2020, the protocol is that year 7 students rotate between the three languages, and in year 8, each student picks one language that they favour most, which is studied for the whole year. Once in year 9, students have the option of continuing study in the language that they have chosen as an elective.

Cultural exchange 
In Year 10, students who have chosen to study French have the opportunity to go on a school trip to France. Additionally, in 2014, the school ran a trip to China, available to students in Years 10 and 11.

Caringbah High School maintains sister school relationships with several other schools internationally:
 Lycée St-Denis in Loches, France
 Gymnasium Raubling in Raubling, Germany
 Xiaoshan no. 3 High School in Hangzhou, Beijing, China
 Oita High School in Oita, Japan (note that students do not visit this school on their Japan trip however students from Oita annually travel to Caringbah and stay with CHS students)

English 
Caringbah High School follows the New South Wales Education Standards Authority curriculum for its English courses for Years 7 - 12. Students learn a variety of skills in the English language, such as analysis of various texts, creative writing, and essay writing. Texts studied include the works of William Shakespeare, Robert Frost and John Steinbeck.

HSC 
Caringbah does not currently offer the English Standard course, instead offering English Advanced, English Extension 1 and English Extension 2. Students also have the opportunity to accelerate their studies, completing the HSC 1-2 years early in Mathematics Advanced, Mathematics Extension 1 and Investigating Science.

History and Geography 
From Years 7 to 10, students study Mandatory History and Mandatory Geography courses. Prior to 2020 they would alternate between History and Geography each semester. Now students in Years 7-10 alternate between History and Geography on an annual basis. In Years 9 and 10, the school also offers additional History and Geography Elective courses on top of the mandatory course. In senior years, the school offers Modern, Ancient and Extension History courses.

Information Technology
Students have the opportunity to complete the 'Talented Computing Program' (TCP) as an elective in years 9 and 10. The preliminary Higher School Certificate course in Information Processes and Technology (IPT) commences on the first semester of year 9; allowing students to complete 2-units of their HSC prior to reaching year 11. Completion of TCP allows the option of undertaking a first-year university level course in computing through the University of New South Wales in year 11 called COMP1917.

Co-curricular

Caringbah High School provides various extra-curricular activities, such as public speaking, debating, Tournament of Minds and HSC distinction courses.

Music 
Caringbah has eighteen musical ensembles, of which many compete in regional and statewide events and performances, including the Sydney Eisteddfod McDonald's Performing Arts Challenge. As a part of the consolidation of campuses, a new, "Music Centre" was created, which houses music classrooms and practice rooms, where students from music classes and music ensembles have classes, can store instruments and practice during lunchtimes and before and after school.

Sporting teams 

Caringbah fields many sporting teams which compete in many sports including water polo, rugby league, soccer, cross country running, lawn bowls, field hockey, mountain biking, tennis, cricket (boys and girls) and squash.

Tournament of Minds 

Caringbah High School has competed in the Tournament of Minds for over 12 years. The school regularly enters two Language Literature Teams, three Social Science Teams and a Maths/Engineering Team. In 2006, the Maths Engineering team, two Social Science teams and a Language Literature team received honours at a regional level. One Language Literature team went on to compete and receive honours at the State level. In 2018, the Social Sciences team won at the Sydney East Regional Finals, and are currently in the process of progressing to the State Final

Green Edge 
In 2009, Green Edge, the school's environmental committee began (unnamed until 2012). The aim of the team is to promote environmental sustainability within the school community. It has undertaken activities such as upgrading light switches to energy efficient timers, introducing a worm farm system, and a school garden. After a period of inactivity, the Green Edge team was re-established in 2015 by a Year 11 student.

Debating 
The school maintains several debating teams consisting of students from all grades, participating in regional debating competitions. In 2014 a team of Year 10 students won the grand final of the Les Gordon History Debating Competition.

Formula 1 in Schools 

The school has participated in the F1 in Schools competition organised by the REA Foundation. After reaching the 2014 New South Wales State finals, the school's Nangamay won the 2016 Southern Sydney Regional Finals and placed third at the 2016 New South Wales State Finals. At the 2017 Australian National Finals held in Adelaide, the team won the innovation award and industry collaboration award, primarily due to their connection with McLaren CEO Ron Dennis. The highlight of the tournament came during the surprise 'pressure challenge' in which the team's closed-wheel racing car became the first car in the world to break the 0.9 second barrier at an official Formula 1 in Schools event, with the fastest time ever recorded of 0.895 seconds.

Duke of Edinburgh Award
Caringbah High offers the Duke of Edinburgh Award program as a co-curricular activity.  In October 1973, Prince Philip, Duke of Edinburgh himself presented the award at the school.

HSC results 
Caringbah High School students achieve consistently high marks in the Higher School Certificate (HSC). In the years 2000–2007, of the 150 student cohort, on average 11 students achieved 99+ (7%), 23 achieved 98+ (15%), and 48 achieved 95+ (31%), with over 98% of students gaining entrance into university. In the 2009 student HSC cohort the average ATAR was 87.8, with 60% of students achieving an ATAR 90+.

The school's HSC rankings from 2007 to 2022 according to Better Education were:
 2007: 26th
 2008: 20th
 2009: 31st
 2010: 35th
 2011: 28th
 2012: 52nd
 2013: 57th
 2014: 38th
 2015: 36th
 2016: 29th
 2017: 39th
 2018: 40th
 2019: 48th
 2020: 30th
 2021: 44th
 2022: 34th

Popular culture
The 2012 Australian television series Puberty Blues was filmed on location at Caringbah High School.

See also 

 List of government schools in New South Wales
 List of selective high schools in New South Wales
 Endeavour Sports High School, also in Caringbah

References

External links 
 Caringbah High School website

Educational institutions established in 1960
Public high schools in Sydney
Selective schools in New South Wales
1960 establishments in Australia
Caringbah South, New South Wales